Oshakati West is an electoral constituency in the Oshana Region of Namibia. It contains the western parts of the town of Oshakati. The Okatana River separates Oshakati West from the Oshakati East constituency. The constituency had 20,015 inhabitants in 2004 and 15,120 registered voters .

Politics
In the 2010 regional elections, SWAPO's Aram Martin won the constituency with 5,156 votes. He defeated challengers Martha Lukolo of the Rally for Democracy and Progress (RDP, 243 votes), Sarastina Ishidhimba of the Congress of Democrats (CoD, 70 votes), Scholastika Iiyambo of the Democratic Turnhalle Alliance (DTA, 62 votes) and Ndamononghenda Ndahalaouwa Nakale of the South West Africa National Union (SWANU, 22 votes).

The SWAPO candidate also won the 2015 regional elections. Johannes Andreas won with 4,775 votes, far ahead of Linus Tobias (DTA) with 253 votes, the only opposition candidate. In the 2020 regional election former councillor Aram Martin (SWAPO) was contesting again and won, albeit by a much smaller margin. He obtained 3,323 votes, followed by Fanuel Henok of the Independent Patriots for Change (IPC), an opposition party formed in August 2020, with 1,309 votes. Independent candidate Paulus Paulus gained 439 votes, and Linus Tobias of the Popular Democratic Movement (PDM, the new name of the DTA), obtained 219.

References

Constituencies of Oshana Region
Oshakati
States and territories established in 1992
1992 establishments in Namibia